The 2013 Asian Youth Para Games, officially known as the 2nd Asian Youth Para Games,  was an Asian youth disabled multi-sport event held in Kuala Lumpur, Malaysia from 26 to 30 October 2013. Around 1200 athletes from 29 participating nations participated at the games which featured 14 sports.

This was the first time Malaysia hosted the games. Malaysia is the second nation to host the Asian Youth Para Games after Japan. The games was opened and closed by Khairy Jamaluddin at the Putra Stadium.

The final medal tally was led by Japan, followed by China, Iran, and host Malaysia.

Organisation

Development and preparation
The Malaysia Asian Youth Para Games Organising Committee (MAYPGOC) was formed to oversee the staging of the games.

Venues
The 2nd Asian Youth Para Games had 15 venues for the games, 13 in Kuala Lumpur and 2 in Selangor.

Marketing

Logo

The 2013 Asian Youth Para Games logo is a bold, freestyle font image which represents the courageous and outgoing nature of youth. The red letters on the logo are outlined in blue with red represents the ambitious nature of these youthful athletes and their determination to succeed while the blue represents the spirit of togetherness and sportsmanship. The white dot of the letter ‘i’ represents the target or goal to be achieved by the athletes, officials and volunteers. The word ‘Malaysia’ represents the host nation of the games, Malaysia itself, while the Asian Paralympic Committee logo above the logo represents both the Asian Paralympic Committee and the Asian Youth Para Games.

Mascot

The mascot of the 2013 Asian Youth Para Games is a mousedeer named, "Ujang". It is said that the mousedeer is a native animal in Malaysia locally known as pelanduk or kancil which is shy, but very agile and quick thinking. It is a favourite character in local folktales commonly known as "Sang Kancil", noted for its intelligence, wit, cunning feints and quick reaction to escape from all kinds of danger, especially from its enemies. The adoption of mousedeer as the games' mascot is to represent the courage of the Paralympic athletes in overcoming challenges and the odds. The name of the mascot, Ujang is a common nickname for local Malay youths.

The games

Participating nations

 (x)

 (x)

Sports

  Archery
  Athletics 
  Badminton 
  Boccia 
  Chess 
  Goalball 
  Judo 
  Powerlifting 
  Swimming 
  Table tennis 
  Bowling 
  Sitting volleyball 
  Wheelchair tennis
  Wheelchair basketball

Medal table

References

External links
 2013 Asian Youth Para Games official website

Asian Youth Para Games
2013 in Asian sport
Asian Youth Para Games
Multi-sport events in Malaysia
International sports competitions hosted by Malaysia
2013 in youth sport
2010s in Kuala Lumpur